Tomo Virk (born 31 May 1960) is a Slovene literary historian and essayist.

Virk was born in Ljubljana in 1960. He studied Comparative literature and German language at the University of Ljubljana and works as a lecturer at the University. He was head of the Jury for the Kresnik Award between 2004 and 2007. In 1996 he received the Rožanc Award for his book of literary essays Ujetniki bolečine (Prisoners of Pain).

Published works
 Duhovna zgodovina (A Spiritual History), 1989
 Postmoderna in »mlada slovenska proza« (Post-modern or Young Slovene Prose), 1991
 Kratka zgodovina večnosti (A Short History of Eternity), 1993
 Bela dama v labirintu: idejni svet J. L. Borgesa (The White Lady in a Labyrinth: the Conceptual Words of J L Borges), 1994
 Ujetniki bolečine (Prisoners of Pain), 1995
 Tekst in kontekst: eseji o sodobni slovenski prozi (Text and Context : Essays on Contemporary Slovene Prose), 1997 * Premisleki o sodobni slovenski prozi (Thoughts on Contemporary Slovene Prose), 1998
 Moderne metode literarne vede in njihove filozofsko teoretske osnove: metodologija 1 (Modern Literary Methods and their Philosophical and Theoretical Bases: Methodology 1), 1999, 2003, 2008
 Strah pred naivnostjo: poetika postmodernistične proze (Fear of Naivety: The Poetics of Postomodernist Prose), 2000
 Primerjalna književnost na prelomu tisočletja: kritični pregled (Comparative Literature at the Turn of the Millennium: A Critical Overview), 2007
 Izleti čez mejo: razprave o evropski in latinskoameriški prozi (Trips Across the Border: Discussions on European and Latin American Prose), 2008

References

Slovenian literary critics
Slovenian essayists
Slovenian translators
Living people
1960 births
University of Ljubljana alumni
Academic staff of the University of Ljubljana